Crow Village Sam (Phillips; 1893 – 1974) was a Yup'ik Alaskan Native who lived in the mid Kuskokwim River valley in Alaska.

Crow Village Sam was born around 1893 in Crow Village, Alaska. Birth records in the area were not maintained until 1914, so that date is based on Crow Village Sam's recollection as told to archeologist Wendell H. Oswalt in 1963. It has been reported by some of his descendants that Sam was half Russian. When he was approximately 10 years old, he was part of the evacuation of Crow Village to a settlement downriver that was referred to as New Crow Village although today it is called Crow Village and the original settlement is referred to as Old Crow Village. He had survived the kanukpuk or "big sickness" - a Kuskokwim influenza epidemic of the early 20th century that wiped out about 50% of the population. He also lived in Akiak, and Chuathbaluk.

By the 1940s, Crow Village Sam was recognized as the leader of the native people living in the mid Kuskokwim valley. He was an accomplished boat builder, wood worker, and snowshoe maker among other things. He was fluent in the English language, which is probably the biggest asset in his role as leader. In 1954, Crow Village Sam orchestrated the abandonment of Crow Village when he moved the inhabitants upstream to Chuathbaluk. Chuathbaluk was a village located 18 miles upstream from Crow Village that had been abandoned since 1929. Crow Village Sam still maintained a fish camp at the abandoned Crow Village with a large fish smoke house and would later install a wind powered generator at Crow Village to supply his radio with electricity. Crow Village Sam was an avid subsistence fisher and had the largest fish smoke house in Chuathbaluk as well.

Crow Village Sam married 3 times. Each wife would die, and he would marry again. Amazingly, each one of his wives was named Lucy. He had at least 7 offspring from his first wife. Given his fluency in English, he was able to officially obtain ownership of the land surrounding Crow Village after the passage of the Alaska Native Claims Settlement Act in 1971. Crow Village Sam died in 1974 at the age of 81. That was remarkable longevity for a person living in that culture during that time frame. The Chuathbaluk grade school built in 1969 was renamed Crow Village Sam School in 1991 in his honor.

References

1890s births
1974 deaths
Native American history of Alaska
Native American leaders
People from Bethel Census Area, Alaska
People of pre-statehood Alaska
Yupik people
20th-century Native Americans